Dhu'l Manar Abrahah also known as Abrahah bin ar-Raish, was an ancient Yemeni king. He is the son of Dhu'l Karnain. He got his name because he feared that his troops would lose their way after they invaded the Magrib land so he built a lighthouse to guide his troops.

References

History of Yemen
Ancient history of Yemen
Year of birth unknown
Year of death unknown
Middle Eastern kings
Dhul-Qarnayn